Cascata del Toce or La Frua,  also known as Frütt Fall in Walser dialect,  is a waterfall on the river Toce, located in the municipality of Formazza, Piedmont, Italy, at 1675 m above the sea level. It takes the name from the river Toce. The waterfall has 143 m of vertical drop e it is 60 m wide (at the base). The waterfall is only completely visible in summer months, during certain hours, as its waters are used for hydroelectric purposes.

References

External links
Cascata del Toce description by Valformazza.it 
Cascata del Toce description by illagomaggiore.com 

Province of Verbano-Cusio-Ossola
Toce